Abdoulaye Sissoko (born 18 July 1992) is a Malian footballer who plays for Moghreb Tétouan.

International career

International goals
Scores and results list Mali's goal tally first.

Honours 
Stade Malien
Winner
Malian Première Division: 2013–14

TP Mazembe
Winner
CAF Confederation Cup: 2017

References

External links 
 

1992 births
Living people
Malian footballers
Malian expatriate footballers
Association football midfielders
Stade Malien players
Espérance Sportive de Tunis players
TP Mazembe players
Moghreb Tétouan players
Tunisian Ligue Professionnelle 1 players
Botola players
Malian expatriate sportspeople in Tunisia
Malian expatriate sportspeople in the Democratic Republic of the Congo
Malian expatriate sportspeople in Morocco
Expatriate footballers in Tunisia
Expatriate footballers in the Democratic Republic of the Congo
Expatriate footballers in Morocco
21st-century Malian people
Mali A' international footballers
2014 African Nations Championship players